The 1918 Ekaterinoslav uprising was a Bolshevik-led uprising in Ekaterinoslav (modern Dnipro) on January 9–11, 1918 that later was supported by the Yegorov's Red Guards of Soviet expeditionary group and grew into open intervention in the Ukrainian internal affairs and war against the Central Council of Ukraine.

The Bolsheviks did lose control  of the city when on April 5, 1918 the German Imperial army (during the 1918 German intervention in Ukraine) took control of it.

Run of events

One important part in the uprising was the bolshevization of the Ekaterinoslav Soviet of Workers’ and Soldiers’ Deputies (November 1917) as well as the creation of a military revolutionary headquarters headed by Vasiliy Averin. The Bolsheviks managed to form a company of 3,000 Red Guards, conducted revolutionary agitation among the city garrison soldiers, and developed and approved uprising plans with the headquarters of the invading Russian Red Forces. By that time Kharkiv was taken over on December 25, 1917 by Russian troops of Khovrin and Sivers who arrived to Kharkiv at night on December 22. Soon after the First All-Ukrainian Congress of Soviets in Kharkiv on December 25, the Russian expeditionary group split with Antonov continued on to Don, while his chief of staff Muravyov took charge with military operations in Ukraine.

On 1 January 1918 Yegorov's troops took Pavlohrad and on January 5 they occupied Synelnykove and Novomoskovsk stopping just outside the city limits of Ekaterinoslav. The same day the chairman of General Secretary of the Ukrainian People's Republic Volodymyr Vynnychenko dismissed Symon Petliura from position of Military Secretary. On 7 January 1918 the city's garrison brought from Oleksandrivsk (Zaporizhia) an armored car. At night local Red Guards stole the car stationing it at the Brayanka factory yard and the next day city administration requested the vehicle to be returned before 14:00. The request was completely ignored. On 8 January 1918 Ukrainian forces shelled the Bryansk Factory (the center of the uprising) and workers’ settlements. The city's Red Guards and garrison soldiers routed Ukrainian forces in the Kaidaky and Amur-Nyzhnodniprovsky city districts and captured the railway station, the telegraph, and other government institutions. The insurgents were supported by the Moscow and Petrograd Red Guard forces of Pavel Yegorov, who arrived from Synelnykove.

On 11 January 1918 the city post office, which was the last resort of the anti-Bolsheviks forces, was taken by storm. On the same day the Soviet regime was established in the city.

Aftermath 
The Bolsheviks were able to keep the city under their control until 4 April 1918. On 5 April 1918 the German Imperial army (during the 1918 German intervention in Ukraine) took control of it.

Ekaterinoslav finally became controlled by the Bolsheviks on 30 December 1919.

See also
 Group of forces in fight with counter revolution in the South Russia

References

External links
Katerynoslav Armed Uprising 1917. Ukrainian Soviet Encyclopedia.
City of Katerynoslav in 1917-20. Dnipropetrovsk city portal
Battle in Katerynoslav, 1917.
Dnipropetrovsk Oblast as part of the Ukrainian SSR. The History of Cities and Villages of the Ukrainian SSR (electronic version). Kyiv: Ukrainian Soviet Encyclopedia, 1969

1918 in Ukraine
Conflicts in 1918
Bolshevik uprisings
Military history of Ukraine
History of Dnipro
Communism in Ukraine
Russian Revolution in Ukraine
January 1918 events